The Democrat and Chronicle is a daily newspaper serving the greater Rochester, New York, area.  At 245 East Main Street in downtown Rochester, the Democrat and Chronicle operates under the ownership of Gannett. The paper's production facility is in the town of Greece, New York. Since the Times-Union merger in 1997, the Democrat and Chronicle is Rochester's only daily circulated newspaper.

History
Founded in 1833 as The Balance, the paper eventually became known as the Daily Democrat. The Daily Democrat merged with another local paper, the Chronicle, in 1870, to become known as the Democrat and Chronicle. The paper was purchased by Gannett in 1928.

In 1997 Gannett merged the evening sister paper the Rochester Times-Union into the Democrat and Chronicle, the two merged staffs in 1992 and had shared the same building since 1959 when the Democrat and Chronicle moved from a location at 59–61 East Main Street on the Main Street Bridge where they had been since 1923.

From 1928 to 1985, the Democrat and Chronicle was Gannett's flagship paper, and Gannett's corporate headquarters were in the Democrat and Chronicle building. Gannett moved its headquarters to Tysons Corner, Virginia; home of USA Today, in 1985. The Democrat and Chronicle who moved into the building in 1959 continued to occupy the historic Gannett Building at 55 Exchange Boulevard until moving to a new smaller building at the Midtown Plaza site on East Main Street in May 2016.

At 153,350 square feet, the former headquarters in the Gannett building was considerably larger than the current headquarters, which is 42,000 square feet. The Democrat and Chronicle no longer needed the much larger space in the new digital age where newsprint in the United States is on the decline and the building which included the space that formerly held the printing presses prior to 1996 was expensive to maintain.

With the move came new branding as D&C Digital, emphasizing focus on the outlet's digital marketing services and video properties.

In 2010, The Democrat and Chronicle ranked number one among US newspapers in market penetration, the percentage of readers in a metro area who read in print or online. The Democrat and Chronicle held that top spot for several years, and have been among the leaders since the 1990s.

In 2023, the paper announced it would relocate its printing offices from Greece, New York to Rockaway, New Jersey that April.

Sexual abuse scandal 
The Democrat and Chronicle, along with its parent company Gannett, was sued in October 2019 by a former paperboy who accused the newspaper of enabling a former district manager to sexually abuse him in the 1980s. In late 2018 this former paperboy emailed investigative reporters and Gannett management asking them to investigate his claims. Karen Magnuson, then Executive Editor for Gannett's Democrat & Chronicle, told reporters to put their investigative reporting of abuse claims on "pause", and brought the email to the attention of Gannett’s management to conduct their own investigation. Gannett COO Michael G. Kane then sent the original claimant a letter indicating no evidence had been found and they were "closing out" the matter. Shortly after New York passed its Child Victim Act lifting statute of limitations on child sex abuse claims. This initial case is currently pending. Four more lawsuits were filed in early 2020. Additionally, three more men filed suit against Gannett for child sex abuse in September 2020. As the New York state window to file under its Childs Victim Act closed in August 2021, a ninth man sued the Democrat and Chronicle, and its publisher Gannett, in Rochester NY alleging child sex abuse by the same former district manager of paper boys. In July 2022, Gannett defense attorneys notified the court of their intent to file a motion to have the former paperboy's Child Victims Act cases taken "out of the state court system and turn them over to the New York Workers’ Compensation Board" stating that the 11-14 year old paperboys should have applied for workman's compensation at the time of their injuries in the 1980s as it is a "simple online process". All these cases are currently pending in New York State court.

Notable contributors
 Earl Caldwell
 Henry W. Clune 
 Marie D. De Jesus  
 Arch Merrill
 Manuel Rivera-Ortiz
 Michael Walsh

References

External links

 Official Site
 Gannett Official Site
 Democrat and Chronicle Archive
 1923 Paper detailing opening of old Pre-Gannett building formerly on Main Street Bridge

Newspapers published in Rochester, New York
Gannett publications
History of Rochester, New York
Daily newspapers published in New York (state)